Bezeten, Het Gat in de Muur  is a 1969 Dutch film directed by Pim de la Parra and starring Alexandra Stewart and .

History 
It was the first post-war collaboration with Germany, which financed most of the film. In contrast to Germany, the film was moderately visited in the Netherlands. As a screenwriter, then-unknown Martin Scorsese contributed to the film's script.

Plot 
The story begins with a medical student in Amsterdam. When hanging a painting, he drills too deep, creating a hole through which he can see inside the neighbors. What goes on there makes him curious, especially when many young women come over and he sees a few things passing by on drugs. He gets help from his girlfriend, a journalist. The story takes a dramatic turn from here, with a shocking ending.

External links 
 

1969 films
1960s thriller films
Dutch thriller films
West German films
Dutch black-and-white films
German thriller films
German black-and-white films
English-language Dutch films
English-language German films
1960s English-language films
1960s German films